Jairo Jose Aquino (born 18 July 1990 in Baldwin Park, California, United States) is an American soccer player who plays for FC Boca Juniors Gibraltar in the Gibraltar Premier Division.

Career

Moldova

Added to the Academia Chișinău of the Moldovan National Division's roster in early 2016, Aquino stated that he was happy to be there and was excited for the opportunity.

Romania

Landing at CS Nuova Mama Mia Becicherecu Mic of the Romanian Liga III alongside American Heriberto Ponce Jr in late 2016, the only two foreigners on the team, the Baldwin Park native wore number 16 for the club. The transfer was arranged by US-based agent George Sangeorzan, who gave credence to their abilities. On the level of the third tier, the midfielder claimed that it was physical and hard tackling.

Personal life

Majoring Kinesiology, at Cal State LA, Aquino is the son of Mauro Aquino and has Salvadoran citizenship.

References

External links
 

1990 births
American soccer players
Association football forwards
American expatriate soccer players
San Jose Earthquakes U23 players
American expatriate sportspeople in Romania
American sportspeople of Salvadoran descent
Living people
Expatriate footballers in Romania
Association football midfielders
Expatriate footballers in Moldova
Cal State Los Angeles Golden Eagles men's soccer players
Mt. SAC Mounties men's soccer players
OC Pateadores Blues players
FC Academia Chișinău players
F.C. Boca Gibraltar players
People from Baldwin Park, California
Sportspeople from Los Angeles County, California
Expatriate footballers in Gibraltar
American expatriate sportspeople in Moldova
Soccer players from California